Subdoluseps pruthi, known commonly as Pruthi's skink or Pruthi's supple skink, is a species of diurnal, terrestrial, insectivorous, lizard in the family Scincidae. The species is endemic to the southern part of the Eastern Ghats in South India. The species was first described based on the type specimen from Chitteri hills in Dharmapuri district of Tamil Nadu. Further surveys reveal the presence of similar-looking skinks in nearby hill ranges. Though described in 1977, the holotype was collected in 1929, and yet very little is known or has been published about this species.

Etymology
The specific name, pruthi, is in honor of Indian entomologist Hem Singh Pruthi (1897–1969), who collected the holotype from Chitteri Hills of central Tamil Nadu.

Geographic range
S. pruthi is found in the southern part of the Eastern Ghats in Dharmapuri district of Tamil Nadu, in South India. This species has been sighted in other ranges of the Eastern Ghats in Tamil Nadu. Further work is necessary to fully chart its geographic range.

References

Further reading
Sharma RC (1977). "A new lizard of the genus Riopa Gray (Scincidae) from Tamil Nadu, India". Records of the Zoological Survey of India 73 (1-4): 41–42. (Riopa pruthi, new species).
Das I (2003). "Growth of Knowledge on the Reptiles of India, with an Introduction to Systematics, Taxonomy and Nomenclature". Journal of the Bombay Natural History Society 100 (2-3): 446–502.
Datta-Roy A, Singh M, Karanth PK (2014). "Phylogeny of endemic skinks of the genus Lygosoma (Squamata: Scincidae) from India suggests an in situ radiation". Journal of Genetics 93 (1): 163–167. http://doi.org/10.1007/s12041-014-0321-z
Ganesh SR, Arumugam M (2016). "Species Richness of Montane Herpetofauna of Southern Eastern Ghats, India: A Historical Resume and a Descriptive Checklist". ''Russian Journal of Herpetology 23 (1): 7-24.

Subdoluseps
Reptiles described in 1977
Reptiles of India
Endemic fauna of India
Taxa named by Ramesh Chandra Sharma